The rope dart or rope javelin, is one of the flexible weapons in Chinese martial arts. Other weapons in this family include the meteor hammer, flying claws, Fei Tou flying weight, and chain whip. Although the flexible weapons share similar movements, each weapon has its own specific techniques.

The rope dart is a long rope (usually ) with a metal dart attached to one end. This was a weapon from ancient times, which allows the user to throw the dart out at a long-range target and use the rope to pull it back. The rope dart can be used for twining, binding, circling, hitting, piercing, tightening, slashing and other techniques.

Rope dart play consists of twining, shooting, and retrieval. Twining and shooting can be done from any joint such as foot, knee, elbow, and neck. The rope is anchored on one hand and played primarily with the other hand.

Skillful use of the rope dart can easily trick an opponent because the dart can shoot out very suddenly, from a person beyond immediate reach.

Just like the chain whip, excellent hand-eye coordination is a must for the practitioner to use this weapon well. In some Wushu training regimens, the chain whip and Changquan are prerequisites for learning the rope dart.

A variation of this weapon is the meteor hammer, which has a blunt weight on the end of the rope. It was used in a similar fashion to the rope dart, and many of the techniques are the same. Another variation is Fei Tou flying weight, which is heavier than rope dart, made of a heavy conical weight on the end of a long rope. Like the rope dart it can be shot out at the opponent, but it is somewhat better suited to bludgeoning swings like the meteor hammer.

History
The earliest known reference to the rope dart as a distinct weapon from the meteor hammer or flying claw is a drawing in a 19th century book about street vendors in Beijing.  The context and items in this drawing as well as photographs from the early 20th century of similar content suggest these rope darts are intended for use in performance art.  These early versions are shown with bamboo tubes that function as a sliding handle.

Construction
The rope dart is constructed from 4 to 5 parts:
 dart
 rings
 rope or fine chain
 flags or bright feathers
 handle (optional)

The dart is made of a hard material, usually iron or steel. It can be of variable weight depending on the users preference, and can be variable in shape (conical, triangular prism, pentagonal prism).

The rings (usually 4 or 5) are attached to the dart head.

The rope is attached to the final ring. Traditionally, the rope was constructed from Chinese rope and covered with wax to minimize friction. In modern times, the rope is often made of a softer synthetic material and covered with talc powder or some other substance to reduce friction.

There is at least one flag attached near, or onto the dart head itself to conceal the dart during play and to add control. Additional flags can be attached to the side rings to slow down the dart and increase control.

The handle is made from the last piece of rope as a slipknot to attach to the anchor hand's wrist.

As performance art
While relatively new, rope dart is used in the object manipulation scenes due to its impressive performances. Because of this, there have been modifications to the original design. Some rope darts have been created to be set alight. A section of fireproof chain between the dart or meteor head and the rope attaches it securely and Kevlar wicks form the flammable head. Other rope darts have heads filled with LED lights. Both of these can be performed in the dark, adding excitement and mystery.

In modern media
 In Season 1 of America's Got Talent: Extreme William Brandon performed a fire dance with the rope dart.
 In the Assassin's Creed series, the Assassin characters Shao Jun, Edward Kenway, Shay Cormac, Adéwalé, Connor Kenway, Arbaaz Mir, and Eivor Varinsdottir use rope darts.
 In the Marvel Cinematic Universe film Shang-Chi and the Legend of the Ten Rings, Shang-Chi’s younger sister Xialing teaches herself how to use a rope dart in secret after being forbidden from training with the boys.
 In the Mortal Kombat series, the character Scorpion uses a rope dart.
 In Destiny 2, the Hunter class uses a rope dart as a melee weapon as well as their super ability when using the Strand subclass.

See also
 Aklys – Roman weapon of similar construction
 Slungshot – a rope with a weighted end, far shorter, though similar in construction.
 Suruchin – Okinawan weapon of similar construction

References

Further reading

External links
  Rope Dart Academy Homepage
 Don Hyun Kiolbassa/Rope Dart
 Description on the Rope Dart

Ancient weapons
Chinese melee weapons
Chain and rope throwing weapons